Archbishop Damaskinos Papandreou, born Dimitrios Papandreou (3 March 1891 – 20 May 1949) was the archbishop of Athens and All Greece from 1941 until his death. He was also the regent of Greece between the pull-out of the German occupation force in 1944 and the return of King George II to Greece in 1946. His rule was between the liberation of Greece from the Axis occupation of Greece during World War II and the Greek Civil War.

Early life 

He was born Dimitrios Papandreou (no relation to the Papandreou political family from Achaea) in Dorvitsa, Greece. He enlisted in the Hellenic Army during the Balkan Wars. He was ordained a priest of the Greek Orthodox Church in 1917. In 1922, he was made Bishop of Corinth. He spent the early 1930s as an ambassador of the Ecumenical Patriarch in the United States, where he labored to help organize the Greek Orthodox Archdiocese of America.

In 1938 he was elected Archbishop of Athens, taking the name Damaskinos. Ioannis Metaxas, dictator of Greece at the time, objected to Damaskinos and forced the cancellation of his election, and the appointment of Metropolitan Chrysanthus to the post. After the 1941 German invasion of Greece and the fall of the Greek government, the Metropolitans who had elected Damaskinos seized the opportunity to eject Chrysanthus from the throne (with German agreement, as the latter had refused to be present at the oath-taking ceremony of the quisling Prime Minister Georgios Tsolakoglu), and Damaskinos was reinstalled.

Nazi occupation 
The Archbishop of Athens was the spiritual leader of the Greek Orthodox people of Athens and All Greece, and Damaskinos worked very hard to live up to his position during those hard times. He frequently clashed with the German authorities and the quisling government. The Germans took Greeks hostage and threatened to execute their hostages in the event of resistance. Damaskinos often visited hostages in prison the night before their executions to offer spiritual comfort to the doomed. The archbishop frequently sent his lawyer, Iannis Yeorgakis, to argue for freedom on behalf of Greeks tried in German military courts. In December 1942, Yeorgakis was banned from representing Greeks before the military courts after he had supposedly insulted a military judge. Initially, Yeorgakis accompanied those convicted by the military courts to their executions to offer moral support, but he found this duty to be so hollowing and heart-breaking that he ceased.  

In 1943, the Germans began the extermination of the Jews of Greece, and their deportations to Nazi concentration camps. Damaskinos formally protested the actions of the occupational authorities. 

Damaskinos first spoke out on behalf of the Jews in March 1943 when he published public letters addressed to Prime Minister Konstantinos Logothetopoulos of the Hellenic State and Günther Altenburg of the Auswärtiges Amt, which together with the Wehrmacht administered Greece. Using his moral authority as archbishop of Athens, Damaskinos also had 19 distinguished Greeks from the arts, the law, academia and business worlds co-sign his letter. Referring to the deportation of the Jews of Thessaloniki to the Auschwitz death camp which already began earlier in March 1943, Damaskinos wrote that he and others in the Orthodox faith followed the words of St. Paul that "there is neither Jew nor Greek". Altenburg in his reply to the archbishop denied that the Jews of Thessaloniki (which was one of the largest Jewish communities in the Balkans) were being exterminated when they arrived in Poland, claiming that they were merely sent to Poland to work in factories while Logothetopoulos never replied.  

According to the International Raoul Wallenberg Foundation, the appeal of Damaskinos and his fellow Greeks is unique as no document similar to the protest against the Nazis during World War II has come to light in any other European country.

The letter in part reads:
 

Damaskinos went on to publish the letter, even though the local Schutzstaffel (SS) commander, Jürgen Stroop, threatened to execute him by firing squad. Damaskinos's famous response to him was:

The Archbishop was being boldly sarcastic, as he was referring to the lynching and hanging of Patriarch Gregory V of Constantinople by a Turkish mob in 1821, the point being made that the SS commander would be acting in a similarly barbaric fashion if he were to carry out his threat.

When the occupying forces decided to execute 50 Greeks in retaliation for sabotage, Archbishop Damaskinos went in person to the office of the supreme German military commander, who initially refused to receive him. In response, the Archbishop stayed in the building and waited for him. Finally, after some persistence, the commander let him in, and after a discussion, the commander revoked his decision to execute Damaskinos.

The churches under his jurisdiction were also ordered quietly by Damaskinos to distribute Christian baptismal certificates to Jews fleeing the Nazis, thus saving thousands of Romaniote Jews in and around Athens. Damaskinos advised his priests to do everything they could to help the Jews and to hide those for whom it was not possible to forge baptismal certificates.  For his actions in saving Greek Jews during the Holocaust, he was named among the Righteous Among the Nations distinction by Yad Vashem.

After the liberation 

After the occupation ended, Damaskinos was proclaimed regent of Greece until a referendum to be held for the return or not of King George II from exile. Harold Macmillan, the junior British minister in charge of Mediterranean affairs met Damaskinos on 14 December 1944 and wrote his impression: "I was impressed by the wide grasp of European politics, the good sense, humor, and courage of this ecclesiastic. He is willing to accept the regency, but realises the difficulties. He shares our view that there must be no reprisals and no counter-revolution". The king was opposed to the idea of a regency and used his friendship with Winston Churchill to turn the prime minister completely against Damaskinos, saying he was both a Communist and a collaborator. Based on what he had heard from the king, Churchill called Damaskinos a "pestilent priest, a survival from the Middle Ages". During this time, fighting broke out between pro-royalist Greek soldiers and communist partisans in the Dekemvriana events. He took control of the situation in his early term, appointing himself Prime Minister during late 1945. Though he wielded little power in his latter term, Damaskinos continued to call for peace and order in the country. 

During the Dekemvriana fighting in Athens, Churchill visited the city and first met Damaskinos on Christmas Day 1944 aboard HMS Ajax. After meeting him, Churchill completely changed his view of him, writing: "It was impossible to doubt that Damaskinos greatly feared the Communists‘ involvement in Greek affairs...Generally he impressed me with a good deal of confidence". On Boxing Day 1944, Churchill again met Damaskinos and wrote "I was already convinced that he was the outstanding figure in the Greek turmoil". The same day, Damaskinos chaired a conference aimed at a peaceful solution to the crisis, attended by members of both EAM and the government. At the conference, it was agreed that King George II would not return at once as he wanted, Damaskinos would continue as Regent, the prime minister Georgios Papandreou would resign in favor of General Nikolaos Plastiras and a ceasefire would be proclaimed to end the fighting. On 3 January 1945, Damaskinos swore in a new government headed by Plastiras, which was described as "wholly republican and moderately left-wing". 

On 12 January 1945, a truce was signed ending the fighting and the ELAS forces were pulled out of Athens to a distance of 70 miles  from the capital. However, EAM refused to release the hostages it had taken, which led Damaskinos in a press statement to state: "I deeply regret that during the negotiations for a truce it was not made possible to settle the question of the hostages". A conference at Varkiza to settle the conflict opened on 2 February 1945, where it was agreed on 11 February after much difficult negotiation that EAM would release its hostages and disarm in exchange for an amnesty, the end of martial law, and a promise to purge from the civil service those Greeks who had collaborated with the Germans. On 12 February 1945, the Treaty of Varkiza as the peace agreement was signed. On 14 February, Churchill visited Athens on his way home from the Yalta conference, and rode in an open car with Damaskinos through the streets of Athens being loudly cheered by 40,000 Athenians.  

He relinquished his position after fighting began to die down and recalled the king formally on September 28, 1946. On 5 July 1947, Damaskinos become a founding member of the Queen's Fund (Vasiliki Pronia) charity founded by Queen Frederica to assist with the children left homeless by the Greek Civil War. He died in Athens in 1949.

Notes

Sources

External links 

  The International Raoul Wallenberg Foundation:Archbishop Damaskinos
 Damaskinos of Athens – his activity to save Jews' lives during the Holocaust, at Yad Vashem website
 

1891 births
1949 deaths
20th-century Eastern Orthodox bishops
20th-century Eastern Orthodox archbishops
20th-century regents of Greece
20th-century prime ministers of Greece
People from Nafpaktia
Prime Ministers of Greece
World War II political leaders
Archbishops of Athens and All Greece
Eastern Orthodox Christians from Greece
Eastern Orthodox Righteous Among the Nations
Greek Righteous Among the Nations
Eastern Orthodox Christians opposed to Nazi Germany
Regents of Greece
Greek military personnel of the Balkan Wars
Greek anti-communists
Orthodox bishops of Corinth